Augustino Marial is a Sudanese boxer. He competed in the men's light middleweight event at the 1984 Summer Olympics. At the 1984 Summer Olympics, he defeated Fletcher Kapito of Malawi, before losing to An Dal-ho of South Korea.

References

Year of birth missing (living people)
Living people
Light-middleweight boxers
Sudanese male boxers
Olympic boxers of Sudan
Boxers at the 1984 Summer Olympics
Place of birth missing (living people)